Knuckey Lagoons Conservation Reserve is a protected area associated with a small  wetland located on the outskirts of Darwin and Palmerston in the Northern Territory of Australia.

The area in which the lagoon is located was named in 1869 after surveyor Richard Randall Knuckey by the Surveyor General, George Goyder.

References 

Conservation reserves in the Northern Territory